Dancing with the Stars was a Greek reality show airing on ANT1 and filmed live in Athens. The show was based on the United Kingdom BBC Television series Strictly Come Dancing and was part of BBC Worldwide's Dancing with the Stars franchise. The theme song was "It's personal" performed by Swedish indie pop band The Radio Dept. The second season of the show started on March 20, 2011. Season's 1 winner Errika Prezarakou joined the judging panel, replacing Galena Velikova. ANT1 launched a daily spin off titled "Dancing with the Stars Daily" on March 21, hosted by former contestant Eugenia Manolidou. The show was canceled on April due to low ratings.

Judges
Alexis Kostalas, announcer, sports commentator
Errika Prezarakou, athlete, Series 1 winner
Giannis Latsios, ANT1 television program manager
Fokas Evagelinos, choreographer, dancer, dance teacher

Couples

Scoring chart

Red numbers indicate the lowest score for each week.
Green numbers indicate the highest score for each week.
 indicates the couple eliminated that week.
 indicates the returning couple that finished in the bottom two.
 indicates the winning couple.
 indicates the runner-up couple.
 indicates the third-place couple.
 indicates the couple didn't dance this week.
 indicates the couple withdrew.

Averages 
This table only counts for dances scored on a traditional 40-points scale.

Παίξε το μετά το ΤΟ ΜΠΛΕ ΤΗΣ ΛΕΒΑΑΝΤΣ (Σελ. 9)

Highest and lowest scoring performances

Weekly scores
Individual judges scores in the chart below (given in parentheses) are listed in this order from left to right: Alexis Kostalas, Errika Prezarakou, Giannis Latsios and Fokas Evaggelinos.

Week 1
Running order

Week 2
Running order

Week 3
Running order

Week 4
Running order

Week 5
Running order

Week 6
Running order

Week 7
Running order

Week 8
Running order

Week 9
Running order

Week 10
Running order

Cha-Cha-Cha Challenge

Week 11 (Thursday)
Running order

Rock n' Roll Marathon

In this live show two competitors were eliminated

Semi-final
Running order

Final
Running order

Παίξε το μετά το KUM-BA-YAH (Σελ. 11)

Guest Stars

Παίξε το μετά το ΧΟΡΟΣ ΤΟΥ 18ου ΑΙΩΝΑ (Σελ. 13)

Ratings

Παίξε το μετ΄το Ο ΓΕΡΟΝΤΑΚΟΣ (Σελ. 15)

External links
Official website of Dancing with the Stars Greece

Παίξε το μετά το ΤΟ ΒΑΛΣ ΤΟΥ ΜΟΝΧΑΙΚΟΥ ΑΣΤΕΡΙΟΥ (Σελ. 16)

Season 02
2011 Greek television seasons